'''The Madras Sappers Museum & Archives''' depicts the history of the Madras Engineering Group also known as Sappers. The museum was established in the year 1979 and is situated in Karnataka, Banglore. The Museum showcases the army artifacts, historical achievements, gallery of sapper generals, attires, armours, more than 4800 books and maps used by the regiment. Local public is not allowed to visit the museum and only people with special permission from the Indian Army are allowed to enter the museum. The Museum also contains rare and Antique artifacts from the 18th and 19th Century and has history written on its walls.

Some of the famed possessions of the Museum include the picture of three Indian Soldiers supporting the Banglore torpedo, the Victoria Cross and five Indian Orders of Merit (IOM), which was highest honor by the British to Indian Soldiers at that time.

References 

Indian Army
Archives in India